Battle Records may refer to
Battle records, a type of record used by DJs consisting of music samples
Battle Records (record label), a record label active in the 1950s and 1960s